SciGenom Labs is a genomics company with facilities in Kochi, India  and USA (San Francisco) functioning as a Genomics incubator. They are certified NABL, ISO and DSIR-GoI recognised. Started in 2009 by Sam Santhosh, the company has over 100 employees spread across its facilities. Units incubated and spun off from SciGenom include MedGenome, a molecular diagnostics testing company with labs in Narayana Heath City (NH) and QB3 Bio (San Francisco), AgriGenome, a company leverging genomics for breeding better crops with labs in Hyderabad and Kochi, Saksin LifeSciences Private Limited, a drug development company with a biobetter molecule for AMD, based in Chennai and MagGenome a bio-nanotech company with nucelci acid extraction products using non-coated magnetics nanoparticles, based in Chennai and Kochi. SGRF (SciGenom Research Foundation) is a non-profit organization supported by SciGenom, which conducts international conferences every year with major research institutions across India  and has a medicinal plant garden called 'Hortus Malabaricus' in Cheruthrurthy, Kerala, India.

References

Publications 

<small>1. Tirumurugaan Krishnaswamy Gopalan.;  Pradheepa Gururaj.;  Ravi Gupta.; Dhinakar Raj Gopal.; Preeti Rajesh.; Balachandran Chidambaram.; Aravindan Kalyanasundaram.; Raja Angamuthu.  (June 2014). "Transcriptome Profiling Reveals Higher Vertebrate Orthologous of Intra-Cytoplasmic Pattern Recognition Receptors in Grey Bamboo Shark". PLoS ONE 9(6): e100018.doi:10.1371/journal.pone.0100018.

2. Ekici.; Halime.; Rao,S.; Sönnerborg, A.; Ramprasad, V.L.; Gupta, R.; Neogi, U.  (Nov 2014)."Cost-efficient HIV-1 drug resistance surveillance using multiplexed high throughput amplicon sequencing: Implications for use in low and middle income countries". Inst för laboratoriemedicin / Dept of Laboratory Medicine..doi: 2014-05-21.

3. Poulter, J.A.;  Al-Araimi, M.; Conte,I.; van Genderen,M.M.; Sheridan,E.; Carr, I.M.; Parry,D.A.; Shires,M.; Carrella,S.; Bradbury,J.; Khan,K.; Lakeman,P.; Sergouniotis,P.I.; Webster,A.R.; Moore,A.T.; Pal,B.; Mohamed,M.D.; Venkataramana,A.; Ramprasad,V.; Shetty,R.; Saktivel,M.; Kumaramanickavel,G.; Tan,A.; Mackey,D.A.; Hewitt,A.W.; Banfi,S.; Ali,M.; Inglehearn,C.F.; Toomes,C.(Nov 2013). "Recessive mutations in SLC38A8 cause foveal hypoplasia and optic nerve misrouting without albinism". Am J Hum Genet.93(6):1143–50. doi: 10.1016/j.ajhg.2013.11.002.

4. Ravi Gupta.; Aakrosh Ratan.; Changanamkandath Rajesh.; Rong Chen.; Hie Lim Kim.; Richard Burhans.; Webb Miller.; Sam Santhosh.; Ramana V Davuluri.; Atul J Butte.; Stephan C Schuster.; Somasekar Seshagiri.; George Thomas.(August 2012).“Sequencing and analysis of a South Asian-Indian personal genome”. BMC Genomics 2012 13:440. doi:10.1186/1471-2164-13-440.

External links 
 SciGenom Labs
 SciGenom Research Foundation
 SciGenom Conferences
 Hortus Malabaricus Garden

Companies based in Chennai
2009 establishments in Tamil Nadu
Indian companies established in 2009
Genomics companies